The News Building may refer to:
Daily News Building or the News Building, headquarters of the New York Daily News until 1995, in New York City, USA
The News Building (London), headquarters of News UK in London, United Kingdom